Oddanchatram block is a revenue block in the Dindigul district of Tamil Nadu, India. It has a total of 35 panchayat villages.

References 
 

Revenue blocks of Dindigul district